Columnaris (also referred to as cottonmouth) is a symptom of disease in fish which results from an infection caused by the Gram-negative, aerobic, rod-shaped bacterium Flavobacterium columnare. It was previously known as Bacillus columnaris, Chondrococcus columnaris, Cytophaga columnaris and Flexibacter columnaris. The bacteria are ubiquitous in fresh water, and cultured fish reared in ponds or raceways are the primary concern – with disease most prevalent in air temperatures above 12–14 °C. It is often mistaken for a fungal infection. The disease is highly contagious and the outcome is often fatal. It is not zoonotic.

Causes
The bacteria usually enter fish through gills, mouth, or small wounds, and is prevalent where high bioloads exist, or where conditions may be stressful due to overcrowding or low dissolved oxygen levels in the water column. The bacteria can persist in water for up to 32 days when the hardness is 50 ppm or more. Minerals are however essential for fish and often the reduction or removal of such minerals in treatment for Columnaris would affect fish mineral uptake and thus affect: oxygen utilization, osmotic regulation, metabolic processes, among may other biological processes and poor minerals (GH) may be a contributing cause to the advancement in severity of this disease, as deficits can increase vulnerability to opportunistic infections (citations).

Symptoms
An infection will usually first manifest in fish by causing frayed and ragged fins. This is followed by the appearance of ulcerations on the skin, and subsequent epidermal loss, identifiable as white or cloudy, fungus-like patches – particularly on the gill filaments. Mucus often also accumulates on the gills, head and dorsal regions. Gills will change colour, either becoming light or dark brown, and may also manifest necrosis. Fish will breathe rapidly and laboriously as a sign of gill damage. Anorexia and lethargy are common, as are mortalities, especially in young fish.

Diagnosis
Bacteria can be isolated from gills, skin and the kidneys. For definitive diagnosis, the pathogen should then be cultured on reduced nutrient agar. Inhibiting contaminant growth on the agar by adding antibiotics and keeping the temperature at 37 °C should improve culture results. Colonies are small, 3–4 mm in diameter, and grow within 24 hours. They are characteristically rhizoid in structure and pale yellow in colour.

Prognosis
Ulcerations develop within 24 to 48 hours. Fatality occurs between 48 and 72 hours if no treatment is pursued; however, at higher temperatures death may occur within hours. Other symptoms may accompany the disease, including lethargy, color loss, redness around the infection site, loss of appetite and twitching or rubbing the body against objects.

Treatment
As Flavobacterium columnare is Gram-negative, fish can be treated with a combination of the antibiotics nitrofurazone and kanamycin administered together synergistically. A medicated fish bath (ideally using aquarium merbromin, alternately methylene blue, or potassium permanganate and salt), is generally a first step, as well lowering the aquarium temperature to 75 °F (24 °C) is a must, since columnaris is much more virulent at higher temperatures, especially 85–90 °F.

Medicated food containing oxytetracycline is also an effective treatment for internal infections, but resistance is emerging. Potassium permanganate, copper sulfate, and hydrogen peroxide can also be applied externally to adult fish and fry, but can be toxic at high concentrations. Vaccines can also be given in the face of an outbreak or to prevent disease occurrence.

References

External links
 Columnaris Disease, expert reviewed and published by Wikivet at http://en.wikivet.net/Columnaris_Disease, accessed 31/08/2011.
 Columnaris disease

Bacterial diseases of fish